This list of longest vines features vine species that can grow very long or vine specimens that are the longest in the world. This list is not all-inclusive in part because many species have never been measured, and also because more careful measurements are needed for many species on this list. Some species have been included because they are the largest of a habit type (such as Poison Oak as longest root climber) or as the longest member of their division or phylum (such as Equisetum giganteum).

A vine can refer to any plant with a growth habit of trailing or scandent (that is, climbing) stems or runners. The first five species are unlikely to be superseded or even to change order of rank.

World's longest vines

See also
 Largest organisms

References

 
Lists of plants
Vines
Vines